Nahan is a town in Himachal Pradesh in India and is the headquarters of the Sirmaur District   It was the capital of the former Sirmur princely state.Nahan is also known as the  Town of ponds.

Geography 
It has an average elevation of 932 metres.

Demographics 
 India census, Nahan tehsil had a population of 35000. Males constitute 54% of the population and females 46%. Nahan has an average literacy rate of 85%, higher than the national average of 59.5%: male literacy is 86%, and female literacy is 79%. In Nahan, 11% of the population is under 6 years of age. According  to 2011 Census of India, Nahan has a population of 56000. The sex ratio was 916 females per thousand males and literacy rate stood at 83.4% with male literacy at 87.01% and female literacy at 76.71%.

Nahan Town 

Nahan is situated on a hill top in the Shiwalik Hills, overlooking green hills. Traditionally, saints and princes are linked with the origin of Nahan. The city was founded as in 1621 by Raja Karam Prakash. Another version recalls a saint who lived with a companion named Nahar on the site where the Nahan palace now stands. "Nahar" means 'don't kill' and the town probably takes its name from an incident when a king was trying to kill a lion and the saint said Nahar, that is 'do not kill it'. The name of the saint was Baba Banwari Das. Another version is that Nahar means Lion in Sanskrit. At the place where Nahan is, Lions were there so it was named  Nahar and latter called Nahan, which is distortion of Nahar

At an altitude of 932 m, Nahan is a used as a base for visits to the surrounding areas such as Renuka Lake, Paonta Sahib, Trilokpur and the Suketi Fossil Park. It is watered by a man-made lake and has several temples and gardens. Nahan has got the crown to organize the second Municipal Corporation in India, after Kolkata.

Underground sewerage system in this town is unbeatable and hence it bears the title to be a neat and clean town. Well planned streets make all the long distances calm and traffic-free. The narrow fields are used by the pedestrians to move fast on foot to avoid traffic.

The Municipal Corporation Office is also situated near to the Pakka Tank. The Sirmour district has been extensively criss-crossed by rivers and the streams and most of them having perennial water flow of considerable volume. With the result, fishing on the rivers and streams has been an old pastime in the district. The mulle, Masheer, Gid and Mirror cap varieties are found on a large scale, helping in the economic well being of the people.

Industrially, Sirmour district was not much advanced. The first such unit was set up in 1875, which was taken over by the govt.

In 1964 A.D. The Chief items of this foundry were cane crusher, cast iron and black sheet panes flour mills, centrifugal pumps mono-block pump sets and other agricultural implements and accessories. This Foundry was overtaken by the Britishers during the British Rule in India. This foundry is situated near the Kalisthan Temple. Also, there is a house opposite to the Nahan Foundry which was constructed by Britishers for the general manager of the foundry in 1945, currently in possession of government as Sessions House where the District & Sessions Judge of Nahan resides.

Places of interest 
The gentle level walks of Villa Round and Hospital Round (Chakkar Ke Sadak) are evocative of the city's past. The hub of Nahan's activities is Chaugan. The Mall Road is one of the favourite place of the youngsters after the college campus to walk along, specially in evening. Evening walk is one of the most common habit found in the citizens of Nahan. People regularly go for evening walk in the market and on The Mall. People like to meet in market and also visit the homes of friends on regular basis, mostly during this evening walk. Gift shops, Rosin & Turpentine factory and local temples are among the other major attractions. Other places of visit include Markanda (8 km from Nahan), Jamta, and Renuka Ji Lake (35 km). In the heart of Nahan town is Rani Tal, where a large temple and a water pond from the days of ex-rulers of Sirmaur state can be seen. Ducks and cranes can be seen playing in the Ranital pond, and Ranital Garden further adds to the charm. Pakka Talab is one of the other ponds which has been renovated. There is a big in the Pakka Tank, and the garden seats are being installed. Pakka Tank is also the place to celebrate two most important festivals of the town, that is BamanDwadshi Fair and Gugga Peer Fair. Pakka tank is also well known for its wholesale vegetable market, which recently shifted to Kanshiwalla. The one and only Railway reservation centre of Nahan is also situated in the Panchayat Ghar, Pakka Tank. Gunnu Ghat is the center of the Nahan City. All short-cuts leads to everywhere from this center point. Historical Miyan Ka mandir is very popular and gets good gathering on Krishna janam Ashtmi.

Religious places 

Shri Digambar Jain Mandir
Shiv Ji Temple Saltevni
Kalisthan Temple
Jagannath Temple
Rani Tal Shiv Temple
Shiva Parvati Temple, Kumhar Gali (300 years old)
Gurudwara Dashmesh Asthaan, Nahan
Gurudwara Jhanda Ji, Shimla Road, Nahan
Shri Krishna Temple, Nahan Cantt.
Miyan Ka Mandir
Lakshmi Narayan Temple, Upper Street
Shudh Dhaar Shiv Mandir
Nainidhar Shiv Mandir
Bhagnari Shiv Mandir
Sanatan Dharam Mandir
Mata Balasundari Temple, Hospital Round
Masjid Shamsher Ganj, Police line
Lakhdata peer ji, Kacha tank*
Jamia Masjid

Nearby places
Paonta Sahib: 45 km
Rajban : 55 km
Rama Dhaun : 14 km
Kala Amb: 17 km
Suketi: 21 km
Trilokpur: 23 km
Dhaulakuan : 24 km
Giri Nagar: 28 km
Renuka: 35 km
Kotla-Molar: 55 km
Palnoo: 50 km
Yamunanagar : 65 km
Ambala : 65 km
Chandigarh  : 85 km
Dehradun  : 92 km
Mussorie  : 125 km
Sarahan  : 43 km
Sadhaura : 31 km
Mandhana : 35 km
Jamta : 13 km
Jaitak Fort : 18 km
Shimla: 135 km

Climate

Suketi Fossil Park 

Suketi Fossil Park, also known as Shivalik Fossil Park, at a distance of 21 km from Nahan, displays lifesize fiber reinforced plastic (FRP) models of pre-historic animals whose fossil skeletons were unearthed here. The park is the first of its kind in Asia to be developed at the actual discovery site of fossils. The Park is located on the left bank of the Markanda river and is approachable by a link road 4 km from highway from Haryana. Located on upper and middle Shiwaliks, consisting mainly of soft sandstone and clay rocks, the park at present has six sets of life-size models, of Stegodonganesa, Sivatherium, Hexaprotodon sivalensis, Colosschelys atlas, Paramachaerdus and Crocodilia, Mesozoic animals which once thrived in the region.

On 31 October 2010, Senior lecturer of commissioned Interns of Department of Geological Survey, found around two and half feet long ivory, buried in Sand soil. The age of the ivory is being told as around 150,000 years, on bases of carbon dating done in the region in the past.

Trilokpur Temple
Raja Dip Prakash built Trilokpur Temple in 1573 and it is situated at a distance of 23 km from Nahan and 6 km from Kala Amb, the gateway to Nahan from Haryana. Trilokpur is a place of great religious importance. The temple of the goddess Mahamaya Bala Sundri is attracts lakhs of devotees from all over northern India, especially from Haryana and Himachal. A fair is held twice a year during the Navratra in April and October when a large number of devotees visit this temple and pay their respects to the goddess.

Dhaula Kuan
Dhaulakuan - On the road to Paonta Sahib 20 km from Nahan, it is worth while to stop and see a sprawling orchard consisting of citrus plants and mangoes and a fruit canning factory of various kinds of juices, jams, pickles and canned fruits. A little away from Dhaula Kuan is Kastasan Devi temple where Raja Jagat Singh defeated the advancing army of Rustam Qadir Rohilla in a great battle. Their victory is commemorated in the Devi Temple, built in gratitude by the Raja. Dhaula Kuan also has a research station of H.P., KVV where useful research on tropical fruits is carried out.

Giri Nagar
Situated at a distance of 5 km from Dhaula Kuan, Nahan- Paonta Sahib main highway, this town has a power house of 60 MW capacity, constructed after diverting the Giri river through a 6 km long tunnel. This town situated on the Giri river so called GIRI NAGAR.It has a power house of 60 MW capacity and supply the power to the Uttar Pradesh and Punjab.

Transport infrastructure

Air
The nearest airport is Chandigarh, with Dehradun as an option. Shimla Airport is the next nearest airport.

Rail
The nearest railway stations are Barara, Ambala, Chandigarh and Kalka, which are connected by a regular bus service. Yamunanagar is another rail station close to the town

Road
Nahan is well connected to Himachal and rest of India through National Highway 7 and National Highway 907A. Nahan is approachable from many directions by road: via Baila from Rajban, via Dehra Dun through Paonta Sahib; via Panchkula-Naraingarh-Kala Amb from Chandigarh, via Yamunanagar-Hathanikund from Haryana  and via Solan-Kumarhatti from Shimla. There are regular bus services linking it to the other towns like Shimla, Chandigarh, Dehradun, Delhi and Haridwar.
If you are coming from Delhi, the best and shortest route option is to take the road via Saha. For Saha, take a right exit from NH1 after crossing Shahbad and then the bridge on River Markanda.

Fairs and festivals

Vaaman Dwadshi
Nahan celebrates Vaaman Dwadshi towards the end of the monsoon, when fifty-two cult images of local gods are carried in procession to Jagannath Temple, where they are floated ceremoniously in a pool and are restored at midnight to their niches.

Gugga Peer Fair
A fair is celebrated in Nahan to mark the honour of Gogaji (गोगाजी) also known as Gugga (is a folk deity of Rajasthan state in India). He is an eminent warrior-hero of the region. Hindus and Muslims alike honor him. He is also venerated as a saint and even as 'snake-god'. He is known as Goga among the Hindus and Jahar Peer among the Muslims. The Kaimkhani Muslims claim descent from him and regard him as a peer (saint).

Jamta Fair
The Ashtami(अष्टमी) Fair is organised in the village Jamta(जमटा) by the Gram Panchayat(ग्राम पंचायत) every year, two days prior the "DUSSHEHRA"(दशहरा) festival.

Education facilities 
The boarding school available at Judda Ka Johar is about 5 km from the main town and is directly run and managed by HRD Ministry of India. Students from distant places come to get education in this institute.

Dr. Yashwant Singh Parmar medical college, Nahan is the newest medical college in Himachal. Its first students started in 2016 with an intake capacity of 100.

Colleges of Himachal Pradesh is in Nahan which provides a dual degree course. Shastri as well as B.A. degree can be availed from this college. The college has its own building and provides a hostel for the boys.

Govt. Post Graduate College is the only centre for the graduation and post graduation Courses of H.P University. Students from distant places come here for there higher education. The college provides the Hostel Facility to the girls.

Near to this town 2 engineering colleges namely Himalayan Group Of Professional Institutions, Kala-amb (20 km) and Green Hills Engg College, Kumarhatti (About 60 km) are available.

Himachal may have been ranked amongst the best in the country with regard to health and education but the picture in the district of Sirmaur in this regard does not seem to be too rosy.

Sirmaur also has number of Computer Education centres.

Other schools available are
Jawahar Navodaya Vidyalaya, Nahan
Career Academy Senior Secondary School
Carmel Convent School
Army Public School Nahan
A.V.N public school
D.A.V Public School
Sirmaur Hills Public School
Holy Heart Public School
Silver Bells Public School Nahan (Middle School)
S.V.N Public School
Model Primary School
Shamsher Senior Secondary School
Cantt Primary School
Mandir Primary School
Parangat Primary School
Aastha Special School  (for special children)

References

External links 
Yellow pages on nahan
Official web page

Cities and towns in Sirmaur district